"Wonderful World" is the second single by British singer James Morrison. The song is the second to be released from his debut album, Undiscovered, which was released on 31 July 2006. The song peaked at number 8 on the UK singles chart in October, following the CD single release. The song was played in a Disney Cinemagic promo in the UK.

A version also appears on the 2007 compilation album, The Saturday Sessions: The Dermot O'Leary Show (EMI).

Track listing

2-track single
 "Wonderful World" - 3:30
 "My Uprising" - 3:44

CD-Maxi
 "Wonderful World" - 3:30
 "You Give Me Something" (Live in Tokyo) - 3:41
 "Better Man - 3:51
 "Wonderful World" (Video)

Music video 
The music video shows James Morrison sitting by a swimming pool with his guitar with many beautiful women sunbathing by a mansion. The video then goes on to reveal that the seemingly ideal life going on is just an illusion - the women in fact are in a mental ward.

Charts

Weekly charts

Year-end charts

Certifications

References

2006 singles
James Morrison (singer) songs
Songs written by Eg White
2006 songs
Polydor Records singles
Songs written by James Morrison (singer)